The Williams Fork is a  tributary of the Yampa River, in north central Colorado in the United States.

See also
 List of rivers of Colorado
 List of tributaries of the Colorado River

References

Rivers of Colorado
Rivers of Moffat County, Colorado
Rivers of Routt County, Colorado
Tributaries of the Colorado River in Colorado